Self-Portrait is an oil on canvas painting by Flemish painter Paul Bril. It was probably painted between 1595 and 1600, and is in the collection of the Rhode Island School of Design Museum in Providence, Rhode Island.

Painting
The painting portraits the artist, elegantly dressed and holding a lute, sitting before his palette and easel, on which a landscape painting sits.

Bril is seen from the back, and is turning towards the viewer. He grasps the lute firmly, with active and jointed fingers. The landscape painting sitting on the easel is typical of Bril's early work which is characterised by small figures, deep and shaded foregrounds and "masses of silvery foliage, attributes that [Bril] shared with other Flemish painters". This has helped with the dating of the work to ca. 1595 – 1600.

In this self-portrait Bril sought to show the viewer who he is and "what he stands for." Bril is serenading his own work, with his hand firmly grasping his lute. However, "very generously," he looks towards the viewer, inviting them "to the dialogue he is having with his own work in progress." The painter is sharing with the viewer a "gradually growing poetic force," to which he gives metaphorical manifestation in the music he's playing with the lute. He is "inviting us to be part of that mystery of creation."

References

External links
Painting at the Web Gallery of Art
Painting at Rhode Island School of Design

1590s paintings
1600s paintings
Paintings in Rhode Island
Paintings in the United States
Self-portraits
Paintings by Paul Bril
Musical instruments in art
Paintings about painting
Collection of the Rhode Island School of Design Museum